Gymnophryxe carthaginiensis is a Palaearctic species of tachinid flies in the genus Gymnophryxe of the family Tachinidae.

Distribution
Palaearctic: China, Southern Europe & North Africa.

References

Diptera of Asia
Diptera of Africa
Diptera of Europe
Exoristinae
Insects described in 1900